Karlee R. Provenza is an American politician serving as a member of the Wyoming House of Representatives from the 45th district. Elected in November 2020, she assumed office on January 4, 2021.

Early life and education 
Provenza was born in Pueblo, Colorado. She earned a Bachelor of Arts degree in psychology from the University of Northern Colorado and a Master of Arts in experimental psychology from the University of Wyoming. She earned a PhD in experimental psychology and law from the University of Wyoming.

Career 
Provenza has worked as an instructor at the University of Wyoming since 2017. She has previously worked as a waitress, photographer, and private investigator. Since 2018, Provenza has been the executive director of Albany County for Proper Policing.

References 

Living people
People from Pueblo, Colorado
University of Northern Colorado alumni
University of Wyoming alumni
Democratic Party members of the Wyoming House of Representatives
Women state legislators in Wyoming
21st-century American politicians
21st-century American women politicians
Year of birth missing (living people)